Dick Block is a historic commercial building located at North Tonawanda in Niagara County, New York.  It was built in 1891 and is a three-story, three bay, red brick building in the Romanesque Revival style. It features rounded windows and arches, rusticated stone detailing, and ornamental brickwork.  The first floor storefronts were modernized about 1946, when the building was occupied by the Witkop and Holmes Company furniture store.

It was listed on the National Register of Historic Places in 2012.

References

Commercial buildings on the National Register of Historic Places in New York (state)
Commercial buildings completed in 1891
Romanesque Revival architecture in New York (state)
Buildings and structures in Niagara County, New York
National Register of Historic Places in Niagara County, New York